Heriberto González (born 23 March 1959) is a Cuban fencer. He competed in the individual and team foil and épée events at the 1980 Summer Olympics.

References

1959 births
Living people
Cuban male fencers
Olympic fencers of Cuba
Fencers at the 1980 Summer Olympics
Pan American Games medalists in fencing
Pan American Games gold medalists for Cuba
Fencers at the 1979 Pan American Games
20th-century Cuban people
21st-century Cuban people